In Real Life is the seventh studio album by American singer-songwriter Mandy Moore, released on May 13, 2022, via Verve Forecast Records. The album is a follow-up to her sixth studio album, Silver Landings (2020).

Background
Following the birth of her first child with husband and Dawes frontman Taylor Goldsmith in February 2021, Moore returned to the studio to record new music that she wrote with her husband during the COVID-19 pandemic. Moore also worked with longtime producer Mike Viola, Dawes drummer Griffin Goldsmith, Dawes keyboardist Lee Pardini, guitarists Madison Cunningham and Sean Watkins, bassists Davey Faragher and Sebastian Steinberg, and Jess Wolfe and Holly Laessig of Lucius.

Promotion
Moore released a short clip on Instagram of an acoustic version of "In Real Life", the first song in the new album, which she performed with her husband in an Instagram reel on March 6, 2022. Three days later, on March 9, she announced in an Instagram post that the song would also become the title of the album and that it was the result of "digging some creative catharsis during quarantine and getting ready to become a mother." On March 18, the music video for "In Real Life" was published on Moore's YouTube channel, which featured her son, her husband, as well as celebrity friends and the cast of the NBC drama This Is Us, where Moore is one of the main cast.

During a guest appearance in The Tonight Show Starring Jimmy Fallon on May 11, Moore announced that she is going on a North American tour to promote the album beginning in Atlanta, Georgia, on June 10. After 12 gigs, the rest of the tour was cancelled due to her pregnancy.

Critical reception

In Real Life received generally positive review from music critics. AllMusic gave the album a positive rating of three and a half stars and stated in its review: "Where its predecessor was filled with songs of rebirth and empowerment, In Real Life is gentler, concentrating on domestic warmth where the partners are healthy enough to know how to meet in the middle -- a compromise that becomes essential with a new baby entering the family." It added that, "It's a welcoming, cheery sound that matches Moore's optimism, but it's hard not to wish there was an occasional loose end or ragged fringe."

Writing for Riff Magazine, Mike DeWald said of the album: "In Real Life showcases Moore's growth and maturity as both a songwriter and performer. The album is fun and breezy, but most importantly, it feels authentic to her personal experience."

Track listing
All music is produced by Mike Viola.

Personnel  
Credits adapted from AllMusic.

 Mandy Moore – vocals, composer
 Taylor Goldsmith  – composer, guitar (acoustic), guitar (electric), piano, vocals
 Mike Viola  – arranger, bass, composer, drums, engineer, guitar (acoustic), guitar (electric), keyboards, percussion, piano, producer, vocals
 Griffin Goldsmith  – drums, percussion
 Dave Cerminara  – engineer, mixing
 Gal Petel – mixing assistant
 Eric Boulanger  – mastering
 Madison Cunningham – guitar (electric)
 Sean Watkins – guitar (acoustic)
 Davey Faraghar –	bass
 Sebastian Steinberg	– bass
 Lee Pardini – hammond B3, keyboards, piano
 Trey Pollard – conductor, string arrangements
 Adrian Olsen	– string engineer
 Anna Bishop	– violin
 Alana Carithers – violin
 Jeannette Jang – violin
 Stacy Matthews – violin
 Adrian Pintea – violin
 Meredith Riley	– violin
 Jocelyn Smith	– violin
 Treesa Gold – string contractor, violin
 Ryan Lannan – cello
 Elizabeth OHara – viola
 Molly Sharp – viola
 Susy Yim – viola
 Jess Wolfe – vocals
 Inara George – vocals
 Holly Laessig – vocals

Charts

References

2022 albums
Albums produced by Mike Viola
Albums impacted by the COVID-19 pandemic
Mandy Moore albums
Verve Forecast Records albums